"Shameless" is a song by Swiss singer-songwriter Luca Hänni. It was written by Allan Eshuijs, Tjeerd Oosterhuis and Matthew Tishler for his second studio album Living the Dream (2013), while production was overseen by Eshuijs and Oosterhuis. Selected as the album's first and only single, the song was released as a digital download on 12 April 2013 by Universal Music. It peaked at number 25 on the Swiss Singles Chart and entered the top fifty in Austria and Germany.

Music video
A music video to accompany the release of "Shameless" was first released onto YouTube on 11 April 2013 at a total length of three minutes and thirty-three seconds.

Charts

Release history

References

2013 singles
2013 songs
Luca Hänni songs
Songs written by Allan Eshuijs
Songs written by Tjeerd Oosterhuis
Songs written by Matthew Tishler